Neville J Bilimoria (born 18 December 1968) is an executive officer and philanthropist. He is the managing director of Bilimoria Impex Pvt. Ltd.

Education and career 
Bilimoria was born on December 18, 1968, in Secunderabad, Telangana, India. He received his bachelor's degree in arts with a major in history from the University of Madras. He did Post Graduate Diploma in Business Analytics (PGDBA) from Annamalai University.

He started his career by taking part in his family business. In 1995, he started his own company Bilimoria & Associate as Managing Partner in Chennai.

Philanthropy 
In 2012, he founded the Neville Endeavours Foundation which conducts the Dawn-to-Dusk & Dusk-to-Dawn (D2D) Marathon to raise funds for donations towards the education and healthcare of children. The foundation has completed 7 editions of this event, raising more than 1.4 crores INR.

Personal life 
Bilimoria is married to Kamini Neville Bilimoria, they have a son Ratan Anirudh Bilimoria.

Accolade(s) 
Bilimoria received the Pride of India Award from ESL Narasimham, the Governor of Telangana and Andhra Pradesh during the inauguration of the Indian Institute of Sports Medicine.

References 

1968 births
Living people